Foodstuffs (NZ) Ltd is a New Zealand grocery company owned by the retailers' cooperatives, Foodstuffs North Island Limited and Foodstuffs South Island Limited. Together, the two cooperatives collectively control an estimated 53% of the New Zealand grocery market. The group owns retail franchises Four Square, New World and Pak'nSave, in-store private labels Pam's, Pam's Finest, and Value (formerly named Budget).

Foodstuffs' major competitor is the New Zealand division of the Australian Woolworths Group through their main supermarket chain Countdown, creating an effective duopoly in New Zealand's supermarket industry.

History 

The first Foodstuffs co-operative was formed in Auckland in 1922. On 6 July 1922, Foodstuffs founder J Heaton Barker called together members of the Auckland Master Grocers' Association to discuss plans for the formation of a co-operative buying group. The buying group expanded in 1925 with the introduction of Four Square branding on members' stores. Similar co-operatives were set up in other parts of the country, with Wellington commencing also in 1922, Christchurch in 1928 and Dunedin in 1948. Initially, the buying groups traded under different names, but in 1935, the name Foodstuffs was applied to all the original co-operatives.

There have been various mergers between the small regional co-operatives, and until recently there were three co-operative companies: Foodstuffs (Auckland) Ltd; Foodstuffs (Wellington) Co-operative Society Ltd, and Foodstuffs South Island Ltd. Each operated independently and autonomously with its own board of directors, chief executive officer and management structure. There were no common members or shareholders. The organisation has continued to evolve, adopting supermarkets early in their evolution with the formation of the New World group in 1963. The Pak'nSave group began later, and the first store was opened in Kaitaia in 1985.

On 7 February 2013, Foodstuffs (Auckland) Ltd and Foodstuffs (Wellington) Co-operative Society Ltd announced that a merger was being planned to bring the two companies together under the name Foodstuffs North Island Ltd. The merged Foodstuffs North Island started trading on 1 September 2013.

Four Square

Four Square is a trans-Tasman chain of small scale grocery stores – ranging from small dairies to small supermarkets. During the 1950s the Foodstuffs advertising department designed the famous "Mr 4 Square" who initially appeared only in newspaper advertising and posters, but was developed to become part of the Four Square identity, appearing in every Four Square store and eventually becoming a nationally recognised symbol in New Zealand, remaining famous to this day. The image is often closely associated with the art of New Zealand artist Dick Frizzell, who has used the iconic character in many of his works.

The current Four Square brand was designed by Auckland branding and design studio Sanders Design.

New World

New World is a full-service supermarket chain. Founded in 1963, New World was the first American-style full-service supermarket brand of Foodstuffs, and the second in New Zealand (after Foodtown). There is a total of 140 New World supermarkets across the North and South Islands of New Zealand (as of October 2017). New World stores tend to be smaller and more upscale than their competitors. Prices tend to be higher in most stores, due to the cost of upscale presentation, large employee numbers (200–300 in some large stores), and often a lack of competition, especially in smaller towns. New World has been a member of the Fly Buys programme since the programme started in September 1996; Foodstuffs has a 25% stake in the Fly Buys company.

The New World brand was designed by Auckland design and branding studio Sanders Design.

Pak'nSave

Pak'nSave is a New Zealand discount supermarket chain owned by the Foodstuffs cooperative. Founded in 1985, Pak'nSave is the most recent of the three current major New Zealand supermarkets (Countdown, New World, and Pak'nSave) to be founded. There are 57 Pak'nSave stores operating across the North and South Islands of New Zealand as of September 2017. Stores are large and have a no-frills environment, often with unlined interiors and concrete floors. Customers are left to pack their own bags or boxes.

Pak'nSave was developed following a trip by a group of Foodstuffs executives to the United States in 1985. On that visit they saw Cub Foods, operated by SuperValu, Pak 'n Save operated by Safeway, and other box warehouse supermarkets. Foodstuffs then copied this format in New Zealand. The original Pak'nSave format was almost an identical copy of Safeway's Pak 'n Save chain in Northern California.

The PAK'nSAVE brand was designed by Auckland design and branding studio Sanders Design.

The stores are supplied daily from their co-operative distributor Foodstuffs. Pak'nSave stores often buys stock in bulk. This process means that stores don't offer a wide variety of products as full-service supermarkets – a 2009 Consumer magazine survey noticed this especially in the pet food and toilet paper categories.

On September 13, 2017, Levin's Write Price supermarket was rebranded as Pak'nSave Mini. Pak'nSave Mini is a small format store that stocks around 2,500 products. In comparison, standard Pak'nSave stores stock approximately 8,000 SKUs.

On the Spot
On the Spot is a chain of over one hundred convenience stores in the South Island.

Liquor retailers

Foodstuffs operates two franchises of independently owned liquor stores: LiquorLand and Henry's Beer, Wine & Spirits.

LiquorLand is run by Foodstuffs North Island and Foodstuffs South Island. It has 147 stores, including 45 Auckland stores. The chain sells a range of spirits, liqueurs, beer, wine, cider, RTDs and snack food, including confectionery.

Henry's Beer, Wine & Spirits is run by Foodstuffs South Island. It has 16 stores in the South Island and sells a range of beer, wine, spirits and snack food.

Wholesalers

 Gilmours (part of Foodstuffs North Island).
 Trents (part of Foodstuffs South Island)

References

External links 
 Foodstuffs
 Foodstuffs South Island
 Henry's Beer, Wine and Spirits
 Gilmours
 Trents

Retail companies of New Zealand
Companies based in Auckland
Supermarkets of New Zealand
New Zealand brands
New Zealand companies established in 1922
Retail companies established in 1922